Techno-Squid Eats Parliament was a 1990s power-pop band based in Little Rock, Arkansas who released a critically acclaimed eponymous album, produced by Grammy winner, John Hampton, on Ardent Records that was re-released on Philips Multimedia as one of the world’s first Enhanced CDs. The CD functioned both as a fully playable compact disc, and when played in a Macintosh personal computer, allowed fans to access additional content such as band interviews, videos, and a tour diary.

History
Techno-Squid Eats Parliament formed in 1992 when childhood friends,  Aaron Sarlo and Clay Bell began searching for a bassist and drummer to fill out their fledgling sound. Sarlo and Bell enlisted the help of Mark Pearrow on bass (Pearrow coined the band’s name) and Shayne Gray on drums. The band’s second show was as a contestant in the Spectrum Weekly Musicians’ Showcase in Little Rock. The judges for the competition were record producer Jim Dickinson,  Jody Stephens of Big Star (who would go on to be the band’s A&R director), John Fry, and Rick Clark, a writer for Billboard Magazine. Techno-Squid Eats Parliament won their night, and shortly thereafter, signed to Ardent Records in Memphis.

Techno-Squid Eats Parliament toured extensively throughout America and Canada, playing SXSW, Crossroads Music Festival, NXNE, in support of their release on Ardent/Philips. The band enjoyed critical acclaim, but failed to catch on with mainstream audiences despite repeated coverage on MTV, opening for acts such as Cheap Trick, Cracker, and Alex Chilton, and press coverage in music industry mainstays like Billboard and CMJ. Techno-Squid Eats Parliament’s lackluster success is largely attributed to their unusual name (record shops would mistakenly stock the band’s album in the Funk section).

Disbanded
In 1995, Techno-Squid Eats Parliament disbanded when drummer, Shayne Gray, quit the band to star in Ira Sachs’s debut film, The Delta. In the wake of TSEP, Clay Bell moved to San Francisco to pursue a solo career, Aaron Sarlo went on to form punk band, Dangerous Idiots, and Mark Pearrow moved to Boston to work at MIT as a research engineer and published author on the topic of web site usability.

Reformed
In 2015, after a 20 year break, Techno-Squid Eats Parliament reformed to release their follow up record,  "We’re Back. What Did We Miss?"

Discography
Techno-Squid Eats Parliament (1994)
I Shot Your Boyfriend / Sometimes Things 7" single [vinyl] (1994)
We’re Back. What Did We Miss? (2015)

Albums

Techno-Squid Eats Parliament (1994)
We’re Back. What Did We Miss? (2015)

Singles
I Shot Your Boyfriend b/w Sometimes Things [vinyl] (1994)

Other formats
Techno-Squid Eats Parliament Enhanced CD (1995)

References

External links
 Aaron Sarlo at IMDb

Musical groups from Little Rock, Arkansas
American power pop groups
Alternative rock groups from Arkansas